"Fotbollsfest" is Swedish soccer/football song written by Fredrik Andersson, Ingvar Irhagen, Christoffer Olssoon and Jens Magnusson, and recorded by Frans featuring Elias in support of the Team Sweden for the 2008 UEFA European Football Championship in Austria and Switzerland. The song is a follow-up hit to "Who's da Man" by Elias featuring Frans that was the biggest summer hit of 2006 in Sweden and was a tribute to the soccer player Zlatan Ibrahimović.

Track listing

Charts

Weekly charts

Year-end charts

Certifications

Release history

References

External links
Music video for "Fotbollfest"

2008 singles
Swedish-language songs
Football songs and chants
Number-one singles in Sweden
Frans Jeppsson-Wall songs
2008 songs